The blue-winged mountain tanager (Anisognathus somptuosus) is a species of bird in the family Thraupidae, the tanagers. It is found in highland forest and woodland in the Andes of Bolivia, Colombia, Ecuador, Peru and Venezuela, as well as a disjunct population in the Venezuelan Coastal Range. It is a common species and its populations appear to be stable. It is generally bright yellow and black with blue to the wings and tail; some populations have a moss-green back. In Bolivia and southernmost Peru, the rump is blue and the voice is very different; this population is sometimes recognized as a separate species, the Bolivian mountain tanager (A. flavinucha).

References

blue-winged mountain tanager
Birds of the Northern Andes
blue-winged mountain tanager
Taxonomy articles created by Polbot